"Good Mourning/Black Friday" is a song by American thrash metal band Megadeth from their 1986 album Peace Sells... but Who's Buying?, written by Dave Mustaine. Despite not being released as a single nor having a music video filmed, the song has become very popular over time.

Music and lyrics
"Good Mourning/Black Friday" is a two-piece song, which begins with an instrumental section called "Good Mourning". The first section starts with a clean intro, highlighted by a melodic guitar solo played by Chris Poland. 

Lyrically, Mustaine has described the second part, "Black Friday", as being about "a homicidal madman who goes on a killing spree". With an excessive use of gory language and violent imagery, the song chronicles the acts of a serial killer. It was inspired by Dijon Carruthers, who was the band's drummer prior to the hiring of Gar Samuelson. According to Mustaine, Carruthers was hanging out with people who were practicing occultism, and they inspired him to write songs based on spiritual themes.

Abandonment live
Up until 1991, the song was a setlist staple, being played at nearly every known concert, including being played live in 1984 with Kerry King onstage. After 1991, however, the band stopped playing the song, due to Mustaine's Christian beliefs. being at odds with its subject matter. Several months before the 25th anniversary of the release of the album Peace Sells... but Who's Buying? in 2011, Mustaine reiterated his reluctance to perform the song.

Accolades

Personnel
Production and performance credits are adapted from the album liner notes.

References

1986 songs
Megadeth songs
Songs written by Dave Mustaine